Möringen (Altm) is a railway station located in Möringen, Germany. The station is located on the Berlin-Lehrte Railway. The train services are operated by Deutsche Bahn. The former Möringen railway station ticket office and building is owned by UK company Octary Ltd.

Train services
The station is serves by the following service(s):

Local services  Wolfsburg - Stendal

References

Railway stations in Saxony-Anhalt